Tatosoma alta is a species of moth in the family Geometridae first described by Alfred Philpott in 1913. It is endemic to New Zealand.

References

Trichopterygini
Moths described in 1913
Moths of New Zealand
Endemic fauna of New Zealand
Taxa named by Alfred Philpott
Endemic moths of New Zealand